Shahrak-e Do Kuheh (also Romanized as Shahrak-e Do Kūheh) is a village in Howmeh Rural District, in the Central District of Andimeshk County, Khuzestan Province, Iran. At the 2006 census, its population was 1,485, in 329 families.

References 

Populated places in Andimeshk County